Wilhelm Piec (born Wilhelm Pietz; 2 November 1915 – 4 April 1954) was a Polish soccer forward player.

Wilhelm was one of the best players of interwar Poland. Together with his older (and more famous) brother Ryszard Piec, they represented Naprzód Lipiny - a small team from a small hamlet of Lipiny, which never managed to qualify to the Polish Soccer League, but which played a significant role in interwar Polish soccer.

He was part of Poland's squad at the 1936 Summer Olympics, but he did not play in any matches. Piec represented Poland in 4 games. He went to the 1938 FIFA World Cup in France, but did not play in the legendary Poland - Brazil game which ended 5-6 (5 June 1938, Strasbourg). During the war he continued playing in Naprzód, which was forced to change its name to TuS Lipine. After the war, in 1946-47, he played in AKS Chorzów.

See also
 Polish Roster in World Cup Soccer France 1938

References

People from Świętochłowice
1915 births
1954 deaths
Polish footballers
Poland international footballers
1938 FIFA World Cup players
People from the Province of Silesia
Sportspeople from Silesian Voivodeship
Association football midfielders